Falling into Place may refer to:
 Falling into Place (Candy Butchers album), 1999
 Falling into Place (EP), the 2001 EP by Finch
 "Falling into Place", a 2004 episode of Six Feet Under
 Falling into Place (David Dallas album), 2013
 Falling into Place (Rebelution album), 2016

See also
Fall into Place, 2009 album by The Sundance Kids